Ivana Šutalo (born 18 December 1994) is a Croatian judoka.

She is the gold medallist of the 2017 Judo Grand Prix Cancún in the +78 kg category.

References

External links
 

1994 births
Living people
Croatian female judoka
Competitors at the 2018 Mediterranean Games
European Games competitors for Croatia
Judoka at the 2019 European Games
21st-century Croatian women